Lal Krishna Advani (born 8 November 1927) is an Indian politician who served as the 7th Deputy Prime Minister of India from 2002 to 2004. Advani is one of the co-founders and a senior leader of the Bharatiya Janata Party. He is a long time member of the Rashtriya Swayamsevak Sangh, a volunteer organisation. He also served as Minister of Home Affairs in the BJP-led National Democratic Alliance government from 1998 to 2004. He was the Leader of the Opposition in the 10th Lok Sabha and 14th Lok Sabha and also the longest serving person of this post. He is widely considered architect of Hindutva politics and was the power centre of BJP in 1990s. He was the Prime Ministerial candidate of BJP in 2009. 

Advani began his political career as a volunteer of Rashtriya Swayamsevak Sangh, a volunteer organisation.He is credited for rise of BJP from 2 seats in 1984 to 182 seats in 1998. In
2015 he was awarded the Padma Vibhushan, India's second highest civilian honour. He has held numerous positions in his career.

Early and personal life
L. K. Advani was born in Karachi, Sindh, British India in a Sindhi Hindu family of businessmen to parents Kishanchand D. Advani and Gyani Devi. He completed his early schooling from Saint Patrick's High School, Karachi, Sindh and then enrolled in Government College Hyderabad, Sindh. His family migrated to India during Partition and settled down in Bombay, where he graduated in Law from the Government Law College of the Bombay University, where he became friends with Deewan Parmanand Gangwani, and considered him, Ram Jethmalani and A.K Brohi the best lawyers produced by Government Law College.

L. K. Advani married Kamla Advani in February 1965. He has a son, Jayant, and a daughter, Pratibha. Pratibha Advani produces TV serial shows, and also supports her father in his political activities.  His wife died on 6 April 2016 due to old age. Despite no longer being an MP, Advani lives in an official bungalow in Delhi due to security considerations, as of June 2019.

Political career

Early career
Advani joined the Rashtriya Swayamsevak Sangh (RSS) in 1941 as a 14-year-old boy. He became a pracharak (full-time worker) of the Karachi branch and developed several shakhas there. After Partition, Advani was sent as a pracharak to Matsya-Alwar in Rajasthan, which had witnessed communal violence following Partition. He worked in Alwar, Bharatpur, Kota, Bundi and Jhalawar districts until 1952.

Bharatiya Jana Sangh
Advani became a member of the Bharatiya Jana Sangh, also known simply as the Jana Sangh, a political party founded in 1951 by Syama Prasad Mookerjee in collaboration with the RSS. He was appointed as the secretary to S. S. Bhandari, then General Secretary of the Jana Sangh in Rajasthan. In 1957, he was moved to Delhi to look after the Parliamentary affairs. He soon became the general secretary and, later, President of the Delhi unit of the Jana Sangh. During 1966 to 1967 he served as the leader of the Bharatiya Jana Sangh in the Interim Delhi Metropolitan Council. After the 1967 elections, he was elected as the Chairman of the First Delhi Metropolitan Council and served till 1970. He also assisted K. R. Malkani in editing the RSS weekly Organiser, and became a member of the national executive in 1966.

He became a member of the Rajya Sabha from Delhi for the six-year tenure from 1970. After serving various positions in the Jana Sangh, he became its President in 1973 at the Kanpur session of the party working committee meeting. His first act as president of the BJS was to expel founder member and veteran leader Balraj Madhok from primary membership of the party for supposedly violating the party directives and acting against the interests of the party. He was a Rajya Sabha member from Gujarat from 1976 to 1982. After the Indira Gandhi's Emergency, the Jana Sangh and many other opposition parties merged into the Janata Party. Advani and colleague Atal Bihari Vajpayee fought the Lok Sabha Elections of 1977 as members of the Janata Party.

Janata Party to Bharatiya Janata Party
The Janata Party was formed by political leaders and activists of various political parties who had been united in opposing the state of Emergency imposed in 1975 by then-Prime Minister Indira Gandhi. After elections were called in 1977, the Janata Party was formed from the union of the Congress (O), the Swatantra Party, the Socialist Party of India, the Jana Sangh and the Lok Dal. Jagjivan Ram split from the Indian National Congress, bringing a small faction known as the Congress for Democracy with him, and joined the Janata alliance. The widespread unpopularity of Emergency rule gave the Janata Party and its allies a landslide victory in the election. Morarji Desai became the Prime Minister of India, Advani became the Minister of Information and Broadcasting and Vajpayee became the Foreign Minister.

The erstwhile members of the Jana Sangh quit the Janata Party and formed the new Bharatiya Janata Party. Advani became a prominent leader of the newly founded BJP and represented the party in the Rajya Sabha (upper house of the Indian Parliament) from Madhya Pradesh for two terms beginning in 1982.

The rise of the BJP

Atal Bihari Vajpayee was appointed the first president of the new party. Ramachandra Guha writes that despite the factional wars within the Janata government, its period in power had seen a rise in support for the RSS, marked by a wave of communal violence in the early 1980s. Despite this, the BJP under Vajpayee initially took a more moderate approach to Hindutva, to gain a wider appeal. This strategy was unsuccessful, as the BJP won only two Lok Sabha seats in the elections of 1984. A few months prior to the election, Indira Gandhi was assassinated, creating a sympathy wave for the Congress that also contributed to the BJP's low tally, as the Congress won a record number of seats. This failure led to a shift in the party's stance; Advani was appointed party president, and the BJP returned to the hardline Hindutva of its predecessor.

Under Advani, the BJP became the political face of the Ayodhya dispute over the Ram Janmabhoomi. In the early 1980s, the Vishwa Hindu Parishad (VHP) had begun a movement for the construction of a temple dedicated to the Hindu deity Rama at the site of the Babri Masjid in Ayodhya. The agitation was on the basis of the belief that the site was the birthplace of Rama, and that a temple once stood there that had been demolished by the Mughal emperor Babur when he constructed the Babri mosque. The Archaeological Survey of India (ASI) has supported the claim that a Hindu structure once stood at the site, without commenting on a possible demolition. The BJP threw its support behind this campaign, and made it a part of their election manifesto, which provided rich dividends in the general elections of 1989. Despite the Congress winning a plurality in the election, it declined to form a government, and so the National Front government of VP Singh was sworn in. The support of the BJP, with its tally of 86 seats, was crucial to the new government.

Advani embarked on a "Rath Yatra", or chariot journey, to mobilise karsevaks, or volunteers, to converge upon the Babri Masjid to offer prayers. This Rath Yatra, undertaken in an air-conditioned van decorated to look like a chariot, began from Somnath in Gujarat and covered a large portion of Northern India until it was stopped by the Chief Minister of Bihar, Lalu Prasad Yadav, on the grounds that it was leading to communal violence. In the 1991 general elections, the BJP won the second largest number of seats, after the Congress. While on the Yatra, Advani carried symbols of the Hindu religion and made multiple speeches regarding the "Hindu society's alleged failure to protect its shrines from desecration by Muslim conquerors".

In 1992, two years after Advani ended his yatra, despite assurances given by the Kalyan Singh-led BJP Government to the Supreme Court, the Babri Masjid was demolished by communal forces, with alleged complicity of the Kalyan Singh government. IPS Officer Anju Gupta reported that Advani delivered a provocative speech prior to the Masjid's demolition. Advani was among the accused in the Babri Masjid case.

On 30 September 2020, the CBI's special court acquitted Advani and released him from all charges. The CBI judge while acquitting Advani mentioned that the demolition was not pre-planned and that the accused were "trying to stop the mob and not incite them".

1996 General Elections
After the 1996 general elections, the BJP became the single largest party and was consequently invited by the President to form the Government. However, Advani himself did not contest the 1996 elections from any constituency over allegations of involvement in the Hawala scandal. Atal Bihari Vajpayee was sworn in as Prime Minister in May 1996. However, the Government did not last long and Vajpayee resigned after thirteen days.

Second term (1998–99)
After two years in the political wilderness, the BJP-led National Democratic Alliance (NDA), came to power with Vajpayee returning as Prime Minister in March 1998, when elections were called after India saw two unstable Governments headed by H. D. Deve Gowda and I. K. Gujral respectively.

After the fall of two United Front government between 1996 and 1998 (H. D. Deve Gowda and I. K. Gujral), the Lok Sabha, (lower house) of India's Parliament was dissolved and new elections were held. Now, a coalition of political parties signed up with BJP to form the Nationwide Democratic Alliance (NDA), headed by A. B. Vajpayee. The NDA won a majority of seats in parliament. However, the govt survived only 13 several months until mid-1999 when All Indian Anna Dravida Munnetra Kazhagam (AIADMK) under J. Jayalalitha withdrew its assistance to the government. With the NDA no longer having a majority, the Parliament was again dissolved and new elections were organised. Vajpayee remained the Prime Minister until elections were organised.

Deputy Prime minister
Advani assumed the office of Home Minister and was later elevated to the position of Deputy Prime Minister. As Union Minister, Advani had a tough time with India facing a string of internal disturbances in the form of rebel attacks allegedly supported by Pakistan. The NDA government lasted for its full term of five years till 2004, the first non-Congress government to do so.

Advani was charged in a scandal where he allegedly received payments through hawala brokers. He and others were later discharged by the Supreme Court of India, because there was no additional evidence that could be used to charge them. According to the judicial inquiry by Central Bureau of Investigation (CBI) they could not find any substantive evidence; the Supreme Court ruling stated that no statement even mentioned Advani's name and that evidence against him was limited to the mention of his name on a few loose sheets of paper.

However, the failure of this prosecution by the CBI was widely criticised. While some believe the CBI probe catapulted his rise through the BJP on his newfound "moral authority", others have claimed the inquiry was a political stunt.

As elections approached in 2004, Advani was supremely confident and conducted an aggressive campaign. The BJP suffered a defeat in the general elections held in 2004, and was forced to sit in the opposition. Another coalition, the United Progressive Alliance led by the resurgent Congress came to power, with Manmohan Singh as Prime Minister. 

Vajpayee retired from active politics after the 2004 defeat, putting Advani to the forefront of the BJP. Advani became Leader of the Opposition in the Lok Sabha from 2004 to 2009. During this period, Advani had to deal with rebellion from within the party. His two close associates, Uma Bharati, and Madan Lal Khurana, and longtime rival Murali Manohar Joshi publicly spoke out against him. In June 2005, he drew much criticism when he, while on a visit to the Jinnah Mausoleum at Karachi – his town of birth, endorsed Mohammad Ali Jinnah and described him a "secular" leader. This did not sit well with the RSS either and Advani was forced to relinquish his post as BJP president. However, he withdrew the resignation a few days later.

The relationship between Advani and the RSS reached a low point when the latter's chief K. S. Sudarshan opined in April 2005 that both Advani and Vajpayee give way to new leaders. At the Silver Jubilee celebrations of the BJP in Mumbai in December 2005, Advani stepped down as party president and Rajnath Singh, a relatively junior politician from the state of Uttar Pradesh was elected in his place. In March 2006, following a bomb blast at a Hindu shrine at Varanasi, Advani undertook a "Bharat Suraksha Yatra" (Sojourn for National Security), to highlight the alleged failure of the ruling United Progressive Alliance in combating terrorism.

Prime Minister candidacy

In an interview with a news channel in December 2006, Advani stated that as the Leader of the Opposition in a parliamentary democracy, he considered himself the Prime Ministerial candidate for the general elections, ending on 16 May 2009. Some of his colleagues were not supportive of his candidacy.

A major factor in favour of Advani was that he had always been the most powerful leader in the BJP with the exception of Vajpayee, who endorsed Advani's candidacy. On 2 May 2007, BJP President Rajnath Singh stated that: "After Atal there is only Advani. Advani is the natural choice. It is he who should be PM". On 10 December 2007, the Parliamentary Board of BJP formally announced that L. K. Advani would be its prime ministerial candidate for the general elections due in 2009.

However, Indian National Congress and its allies won the 2009 general elections, allowing incumbent Prime Minister Manmohan Singh to continue in office. Following the defeat in the elections, L. K. Advani paved the way for Sushma Swaraj to become the Leader of the Opposition in the Lok Sabha. However later he was elected Working Chairman of the National Democratic Alliance in 2010.

Marg Darshak Mandal
In 2014, Advani joined the Marg Darshak Mandal (vision committee) of the BJP along with Murli Manohar Joshi and Atal Bihari Vajpayee.

Rath Yatras
In a bid to boost the popularity of the BJP and unify the Hindutva ideology, Advani organised 6 long distance rath yatras or processions across the country, starting in 1987.

Ram Rath Yatra: Advani started his first Rath Yatra from Somnath, Gujarat on 25 September 1990 to finally reach Ayodhya on 30 October 1990. The yatra has been linked to the Mandir-Masjid dispute centred around Ram Janmabhoomi-Babri Masjid site at Ayodhya. The BJP and Advani, however, focused the yatra on the secularism–communalism debate. The yatra was stopped in Bihar by Lalu Prasad Yadav, then Chief Minister of Bihar and was arrested on the orders of Vishwanath Pratap Singh, then Prime Minister of India.
Janadesh Yatra: Four Yatras named Janadesh Yatra started on 11 September 1993 from four corners of country. Advani led this yatra from Mysore. Travelling through 14 States and two Union Territories, the yatris congregated at Bhopal on 25 September in a massive rally. The purpose of Janadesh Yatrawas to seek the people's mandate against the two Bills, the Constitution 80th Amendment Bill and the Representation of People (Amendment) Bill.
Swarna Jayanti Rath Yatra: The Swarna Jayanti Rath Yatra by Mr. Advani travelled across India between May and July 1997. According to Mr.Advani, the yatra was conducted in celebration of 50 years of Indian Independence and also to project the BJP as a party committed to good governance.
Bharat Uday Yatra: The Bharat Uday Yatra took place in the run-up to the 2004 Lok Sabha Elections.
Bharat Suraksha Yatra: The BJP launched a nationwide mass political campaign in the form of the Bharat Suraksha Yatra from 6 April to 10 May 2006. It consisted of two yatras – one led by Advani, Leader of the Opposition (Lok Sabha), from Dwaraka in Gujarat to Delhi; and the other led by Rajnath Singh, then the President of the BJP, from Jagannath Puri in Orissa to Delhi. The yatra was focused on left wing terrorism, minority politics, corruption, protection of democracy and price rise.
Jan Chetna Yatra: The Jan Chetna Yatra was launched on 11 October 2011 from Sitab Diara, Bihar. The BJP states the purpose of Jan Chetna Yatra is to mobilise public opinion against corruption of the UPA government and put BJP agenda of good governance and clean politics before the people of India.

Writings
My Country My Life is an autobiographical book by L. K. Advani. The book was released on 19 March 2008 by Abdul Kalam, the eleventh President of India. The book has 1,040 pages and narrates autobiographical accounts and events in the life of Advani. The book became a best seller in the non-fiction category. The book includes mentions of events in Indian politics and India's history from 1900 till 2007.
 As I See It: LK Advani's Blog Posts (2011). .
 My Country My Life (2008). .
 New Approaches to Security and Development (2003). (Paperback) .
 A Prisoner's Scrap-Book (2002). (Hardcover) .
 Nazarband Loktantra (2016).(Hardcover)  . 
 Drishtikon (2016).(Hardcover)
 Rashtra Sarvopari. (2014).(Hardcover)

Opinions 

 In 2005, while visiting Pakistan, he praised Muhammad Ali Jinnah  and his speech of 11 August 1947 for promoting a secular state.

Positions

 1967–70: Chairman, Metropolitan Council, Delhi 
 1970–72: President, Bharatiya Jana Sangh, Delhi
 1970–89: Member, Rajya Sabha (four terms)
 1973–77: President, Jana Sangh
 1977: General-Secretary, Janata Party
 1977–79: Union Cabinet Minister, Ministry of Information and Broadcasting
 1977–79: Leader of the House, Rajya Sabha
 1980–86: General Secretary, Bharatiya Janata Party (BJP)
 1980-86: Leader, BJP, Rajya Sabha
 1986–91: President, BJP
 1989: Elected to 9th Lok Sabha (1st term as Lok Sabha member), New Delhi constituency
 1989–91: Leader of the Opposition, Lok Sabha
 1991: Elected to 10th Lok Sabha (2nd term), from Gandhinagar
 1991–93: Leader of the Opposition, Lok Sabha
 1993–98: President, Bharatiya Janata Party
 Did not contest 1996 election, and did not join the 13-day Vajpayee govt as hawala case was pending against him. 
 1998: Elected to 12th Lok Sabha (3rd term)
 1998–99: Union Cabinet Minister, Home Affairs
 1999: Elected to 13th Lok Sabha (4th term)
 1999–2004: Union Cabinet Minister, Home Affairs
 2002–2004: Deputy Prime Minister of India (he held the role of Prime Minister at that time)
 2004: Elected to 14th Lok Sabha (5th term)
 2009: Elected to 15th Lok Sabha (6th term)
 2014: Elected to 16th Lok Sabha (7th term)

See also
 Electoral history of L. K. Advani
Ayodhya dispute
Hawala scandal

References

Further reading
 
 Atmaram Kulkarni. The Advent of Advani: An Authentic Critical Biography (1995). (Hardcover) .
 Sudheendra Kulkarni. Swarna Jayanti Rath Yatra: The story of Lal Krishna Advani's patriotic pilgrimage (1997). ASIN: B0000CPBO7.
 Pentagon Press. Lal Krishna Advani: Today's Patel (2002). (Paperback) .
 Gulab Vazirani: Lal Advani, the Man and his Mission (1991)
 G. Katyal, K. Bhushan. Lal Krishna Advani: Deputy Prime Minister. (Hardcover) ASIN: B001G6MAZA
 Pentagon Press. Lala Krishna Advani (2007). (Paperback) .

External links

 Official site
 Profile at Lok Sabha, Parliament of India 
 Profile on website of BJP
 Profile at BBC News
 Official Blog of Lal Krishna Advani

|-

1927 births
Living people
Indian Deputy Prime Ministers
Presidents of Bharatiya Janata Party
Bharatiya Jana Sangh politicians
Bharatiya Janata Party politicians from Gujarat
Leaders of the Opposition (India)
Ministers of Internal Affairs of India
Ministers for Information and Broadcasting of India
Coal Ministers of India
India MPs 1989–1991
India MPs 1991–1996
India MPs 1998–1999
India MPs 1999–2004
India MPs 2004–2009
India MPs 2009–2014
India MPs 2014–2019
Lok Sabha members from Gujarat
Lok Sabha members from Delhi
Rajya Sabha members from Delhi
Rajya Sabha members from Gujarat
Rajya Sabha members from Madhya Pradesh
Indians imprisoned during the Emergency (India)
St. Patrick's High School, Karachi alumni
University of Mumbai alumni
Indian Hindus
Sindhi people
Politicians from Karachi
21st-century Indian biographers
Recipients of the Padma Vibhushan in public affairs
Indian autobiographers
Sindhi politicians
Rajya Sabha members from the Bharatiya Janata Party
People charged with crimes
People charged with corruption